CLG Eoghan Rua Cúil Raithin is a Gaelic Athletic Association club based in Coleraine, County Londonderry, Northern Ireland. Despite some of the club's catchment area being in County Antrim, the club is a member of the Derry GAA. Eoghan Rua currently cater for Gaelic Football, Hurling, Camogie, and Ladies' Gaelic football and also compete in Scór and Scór n nÓg. The club's name commemorates Eoghan Rua Ó Néill.

In addition to drawing players from Coleraine, the club's catchment area includes Portstewart and Portrush. The club's grounds are on the main road between Coleraine and Portstewart and were completed in 2007. Underage teams up to U-12s play in North Derry league and championships; from U-14 upwards teams compete in All-Derry competitions.

The club's biggest success was when they won the 2010 & 2018 Derry Senior Football Championship. In 2006 they won the Ulster Intermediate Club Football Championship and the Derry Intermediate Football Championship for the first time.

2019 Championship Football

2018 Championship Football

2017 Championship Football

2016 Championship Football

 Match Info Source derrygaa.ie

Hurling
The club has U10, U12, U14, U16, Minor and Senior hurling teams and currently competes in the Derry Senior and Derry Junior Championships and Division 2 of the Derry ACHL.

Camogie
Eoghan Rua fields Camogie teams at U10, U12, U14, U16, Minor and Senior levels. The club currently competes in the Derry Intermediate Camogie Championship and the Derry Intermediate Camogie League.

History

Gaelic football

CLG Eoghan Rua were established in 1957. The club first major football success came in 1997 when they won the Derry Junior Club Football Championship, defeating Lissan in the final. In 2006 they won the Derry Intermediate Club final in 2006. The team went on to win the 2006 Ulster Intermediate Club Football Championship, with victory over Ballymacna of Armagh in the final (which was played in February 2007 due to delays). In the All-Ireland Club semi-final they beat Mayo champions Tourmakeady, before losing narrowly to Ardfert of Kerry in the All-Ireland Intermediate Club Football Championship final on 10 March 2007 in Croke Park.

In May 2006 Barry McGoldrick became the first Eoghan Rua player to play in the All-Ireland Senior Football Championship when he was part of the Derry team that defeated Tyrone in the first round of the Ulster Championship in Healy Park. His brother, Seán Leo McGoldrick made his debut for Derry in the 2007 McKenna Cup v Queen's University Belfast. Both have also played for Derry hurlers.

In 2007 they became champions of Derry ACFL Division 3, winning promotion Division 2 for the first time in their history.

The current football manager is Sean McGoldrick.

Hurling
Previous to the founding of CLG Eoghan Rua, there had been a hurling club in Coleraine called Mitchel's and they had won the 1943 and 1945 Derry Senior Hurling Championships. Eoghan Rua entered a Senior Hurling team in 2002, having fielded underage teams for a few years before this. 2006 saw the club win both the Derry Intermediate Hurling Championship and the Derry Junior Hurling Championship.

Camogie
A Senior Camogie team fielded for the first time in 2001/2? The club won their first Derry Intermediate Camogie Championship in 2005 and again in 2007. They won the Derry Premier Championship in 2010 and the Ulster Senior B Championship in the same year. Current senior camogs Gráinne McGoldrick, Jane Carey, Méabh McGoldrick and Roma McDonald were on the Derry senior squad that contested the 2006 All-Ireland Junior Camogie Final. They were defeated by Dublin. The same four players were part of the Derry team that went one step further in 2007 and won the All-Ireland Junior Camogie Championship, defeating Clare in the final.

In 2010 the camogie teams won the Derry Premier League and Championship Double completing both campaigns unbeaten. They went on to win the Ulster Senior B Championship.

Eoghan Rua and Derry forward Gráinne McGoldrick received a camogie All Star in 2009.

Titles won

Football

Senior 

 All-Ireland Kilmacud 7's Championship: 1
 2017

Derry Senior Football Championship: 2
 2010, 2018
Derry Division 1 Football League: 1
 2017
Derry Division 2 Football League: 1
 2009
Derry Division 3 Football League 1
2007
Ulster Senior Football League: 2
 2017, 2018
Dr Kerlin Cup: 2
 2017, 2019
Ulster Intermediate Football Championship: 1
2006
Derry Intermediate Football Championship: 1
2006
Derry Junior Football Championship: 1
1997
Derry Junior Football League: 2
 1997, 2000

Minor
Tommy O'Neill Cup (Derry Minor 'B' Football Championship) 1
2000
North Derry Minor 'B' Football Championship: 1
2000

Under-16
 North Derry Under-16 'B' Football Championship: 3
 2000, 2002, 2007

Under-14
 North Derry Under-14 'B' Football Championship: 2
 2003, 2007

Hurling

Senior

 Ulster Junior Club Hurling Championship: 2
 2015, 2019
Derry Intermediate Hurling Championship: 1?
2006
Derry Junior Hurling Championship: 1?
2006

Camogie
Ulster Club Senior Camogie B Championship
2010
 Derry Premier League Championship
 2010
 Derry Premier Championship
 2010
 Ulster Premier League Cup
 2009
 Derry Premier League
 2009
 Gulf Gaelic Games Camogie
 2009
 Ulster Premier Shield
 2008
 Ulster Championship
 2010
 All-Ireland Senior "B" Camogie Championship
 2010
 Derry Intermediate Camogie Championship:
 2005, 2007

Note: The above lists may be incomplete. Please add any other honours you know of.

Well known players
 Niall Holly; current Derry senior footballer and hurler.
 Barry McGoldrick; first Eoghan Rua player to play for Derry in All-Ireland Senior Football Championship.

See also
Derry Intermediate Football Championship
List of Gaelic games clubs in Derry

External links
CLG Eoghan Rua website

References

Gaelic games clubs in County Londonderry
Gaelic football clubs in County Londonderry
Hurling clubs in County Londonderry
1957 establishments in Northern Ireland